The Exhibit of American Negroes was a sociological display within the Palace of Social Economy at the 1900 World's Fair in Paris. The exhibit was a joint effort between Daniel Murray, the Assistant Librarian of Congress, Thomas J. Calloway, a lawyer and the primary organizer of the exhibit, and W. E. B. Du Bois. The goal of the exhibition was to demonstrate progress and commemorate the lives of African Americans at the turn of the century.

The exhibit included a statuette of Frederick Douglass, four bound volumes of nearly 400 official patents by African Americans, photographs from several educational institutions (Fisk University, Howard University, Roger Williams University, Tuskegee Institute, Claflin University, Berea College, North Carolina A&T), an African-American bibliography by the Library of Congress containing 1,400 titles, and two social studies directed by W. E. B. Du Bois: "The Georgia Negro" (comprising 32 handmade graphs and charts), and a set of about 30 statistical graphics on the African-American population made by Du Bois's students at Atlanta University. Most memorably, the exhibit displayed some five hundred photographs of African-American men and women, homes, churches, businesses and landscapes including photographs from Thomas E. Askew.

Founding
Thomas Junius Calloway, an African-American lawyer and educator, sent a letter to over one hundred African-American representatives in various sections of the United States, including Booker T. Washington, to solicit help in advocating for an exhibit to present at the world's fair in Paris. The letter insists that, "thousands upon thousands will go [to the fair], and a well selected and prepared exhibit, representing the Negro's development in his churches, his schools, his homes, his farms, his stores, his professions and pursuits in general will attract attention... and do a great and lasting good in convincing thinking people of the possibilities of the Negro." Washington appealed personally to President William McKinley and just four months before the opening of the Paris Exposition, Congress allocated $15,000 to fund the exhibit. Calloway enlisted Du Bois, with whom he had formerly been classmates at Fisk, and Daniel Murray, Assistant to the Librarian of Congress, to assemble materials.

Du Bois included photographs that he called "typical Negro faces," exemplifying the accomplishment and progress of African Americans. He compiled a set of three large albums of photographs, the photographer of which was never identified at the exhibit. Some were formal studio portraits, but there were also informal snapshots of groups of people, children playing in the streets, people working, family outings, images of houses and businesses and the interiors of homes.

The exhibit was separate from United States national building, within the shared space of the Palace of Social Economy and Congresses with maps detailing U.S. resources, New York City tenement models, and information on labor unions, railroad pensions and libraries. It was displayed from April to November 1900 and over 50 million people passed through.

Mainstream American newspapers generally ignored the existence of the Negro Exhibit, and the U.S. commissioner-general failed to mention the Negro Exhibit in his comprehensive article published in the North American Review. Still, the Negro Exhibit occupied one fourth of the total exhibition space allocated to the US in the multinational Palace of Social Economy and Congresses, and Black periodicals like The Colored American wrote extensively about the project.

Current location
Today the Exhibit of American Negroes is housed at the Library of Congress.

See also
Lincoln Jubilee

References

External links 
 CAAS 588 Paris Exposition
 African American Photographs Assembled for 1900 Paris Exposition, Library of Congress
 Paris 1900 The Exhibit of American Negroes
 World's Fair, Paris, 1900, Digital Archive of Architecture, Boston College
 Du Bois in Paris – Exposition Universelle, 1900, Library of Congress blog
 W. E. B. Du Bois's Data Portraits: Visualizing Black America, edited by Whitney Battle-Baptiste and Britt Rusert, Princeton Architectural Press, 2018, .

Exposition Universelle (1900)
1900 in France
African-American history between emancipation and the civil rights movement
African-American festivals
1900 festivals